Udiča is a village and municipality in Považská Bystrica District in the Trenčín Region of north-western  Slovakia.

History
In historical records the village was first mentioned in 1321.

Geography
The municipality lies at an altitude of 282 metres and covers an area of 22.146 km2. It has a population of about 2234 people.

References

External links

 
http://www.statistics.sk/mosmis/eng/run.html

Villages and municipalities in Považská Bystrica District